Urban Yeti! is an action video game developed by Cave Barn Studios and published by Telegames for the Game Boy Advance. It was released in North America on August 16, 2002.

Gameplay

The plot of Urban Yeti! focuses on a yeti's quest to find a yeti mate in a large city populated with humans. The game plays from a top-down perspective similar to the early Grand Theft Auto games. The player must make their way through the city in order to come across missions, which take the form of separate minigames, such as when the yeti must get a job in order to earn the money to pay a toll to cross a bridge.

As the yeti walks around the city, he is attacked by townspeople and must try to avoid being killed. The game features four minigames and four missions to complete. Once minigames are completed, the player is unable to go back and play them again unless they type in the password for the section of the game they are in.

Development
Urban Yeti! was published by Telegames and published by UK developer Cave Barn Studios.

Reception
Urban Yeti! received mixed reviews from critics, who praised the game's humor but criticized its technical problems. It received a 67% and a 68.71% from review aggregate websites Metacritic and GameRankings respectively. IGN's Craig Harris criticized the game's slow frame rate and technical problems, stating, "... because of the loose and sloppy presentation it ends up feeling like a game produced by a few guys down in someone's basement...instead of something out of an established development studio." Allgame's Brett Alan Weiss noted that the game had charming moments, but ultimately had little replay value and had too many graphical problems. GameZone's Scott Kuvin felt that the collision detection of the game had some glitches, but felt that the game's humor overcame any technical problems.

References

2002 video games
Action video games
Game Boy Advance games
Game Boy Advance-only games
North America-exclusive video games
Top-down video games
Video games developed in Canada
Yeti in fiction
Single-player video games
Telegames games